Bridging the Gap is the second studio album by American hip hop group Black Eyed Peas, released on September 26, 2000. This is their last album where they are credited as Black Eyed Peas, until the release of Masters of the Sun Vol. 1 in 2018.

The album had three official singles: "BEP Empire/Get Original", "Weekends" and "Request + Line", the last featuring Macy Gray. The song "Weekends" was later remixed and renamed "Another Weekend" for the Deluxe Edition of their fifth studio album, The E.N.D. Singer Kim Hill was deeply involved in making the album, but left the group after it was released. The album received favorable reviews, and holds a score of 74 on Metacritic.

Track listing

Personnel
will.i.am – vocals, art direction, composer
apl.de.ap – vocals, composer
Taboo – vocals, composer
Kim Hill – vocals, composer
George Pajon – guitar
Printz Board – trumpet, bass, keyboards 
Rhett Lawrence – composer, producer
Roberto Cani – strings
Suzanna Giordono – strings
Susan Chatman – horn section, strings
Chali 2na – featured artist
De La Soul – featured artist
Esthero – featured artist
Macy Gray – featured artist
Wyclef Jean – featured artist
Mos Def – featured artist
Les Nubians – featured artist
Ian Alexander – art direction, executive producer
Dave Pensado – mix engineer
Dylan Dresdo – mix engineer
Dejuana Richardson – engineer
Eddie Sancho – engineer
Tom Coyne – mastering
Seth Friedman – package design
Tatiana Litvin – art coordinator

Charts

Certifications

References

External links

2000 albums
Albums produced by will.i.am
A&M Records albums
Interscope Geffen A&M Records albums
Black Eyed Peas albums